An angle grinder, also known as a side grinder or disc grinder, is a handheld power tool used for grinding (abrasive cutting) and polishing. Although developed originally as tools for rigid abrasive discs, the availability of an interchangeable power source has encouraged their use with a wide variety of cutters and attachments.

Angle grinders can be powered by an electric motor or compressed air. The motor drives a geared head at a right-angle on which is mounted an abrasive disc or a thinner cut-off disc, either of which can be replaced when worn. Angle grinders typically have an adjustable guard and a side-handle for two-handed operation. Certain angle grinders, depending on their speed range, can be used as sanders, employing a sanding disc with a backing pad or disc. The backing system is typically made of hard plastic, phenolic resin, or medium-hard rubber depending on the amount of flexibility desired.

Angle grinders are standard equipment in metal fabrication shops and on construction sites. They are also common in machine shops, along with die grinders and bench grinders.

Uses
Angle grinders may be used for removing excess material from a piece. There are many different kinds of discs that are used for various materials and tasks, such as cut-off discs (diamond blade), abrasive grinding discs, grinding stones, sanding discs, wire brush wheels and polishing pads. The angle grinder has large bearings to counter side forces generated during cutting, unlike a power drill, where the force is axial.

Angle grinders are widely used in metalworking and construction,emergency rescues and even for bicycle thefts. Generally, they are found in workshops, service garages and auto body repair shops. There are a large variety of angle grinders to choose from when trying to find the right one for the job. The most important factors in choosing the right grinder are the disc size and the power of the motor. Other factors include power source (pneumatic or electric), rpm, and arbor size. Generally disc size and power increase together. Disc size is usually measured in inches or millimetres. Common disc sizes for angle grinders in the United States include 4, 4.5, 5, 6, 7, 9 and 12 inches, with the most popular sizes being the 4 and 4.5" size. In Europe the most common sizes for angle grinder discs are 115 and 125 millimeters. Discs for pneumatic grinders also come much smaller. Pneumatic grinders are generally used for lighter duty jobs where more precision is required. This is likely because pneumatic grinders can be small and light yet remain powerful, because they do not contain heavy copper motor windings, while it is harder for an electric grinder to maintain adequate power with smaller size. Electric grinders are more commonly used for larger, heavy duty jobs. However, there are also small electric grinders and large pneumatic grinders.

Angle grinders have been used to remove wheel clamps from vehicles.

Safety

Through a sound pressure level and vibrations study conducted by the National Institute for Occupational Safety and Health, grinders under an unloaded condition ranged from 91 to 103 dBA. In addition, angle grinders produce sparks when cutting ferrous metals. They also produce shards cutting other materials. The blades themselves may also break. This is a great hazard to the face and eyes especially, as well as other parts of the body, and as such, a full face shield and other protective clothing must be worn. Angle grinders should never be used without their guard or handle attached. All workpieces should be securely clamped or held firmly in a vise.

History
The high-speed angle grinder was invented in 1954 by German company Ackermann + Schmitt (FLEX-Elektrowerkzeuge GmbH) in Steinheim an der Murr. Owing to this, in German, Dutch, Slovak, Czech, Polish, Croatian, Romanian, Hungarian, Bulgarian and Latvian, an angle grinder is colloquially called just a "flex", in Italy and in spanish-speaking countries it is sometimes called "flexible". In Polish it is also known as "kątówka" or "gumówka" (= the rubber thing), which refers to the elasticity of certain types of disks. However they are never made out of true rubber due to fire hazard. In Russian, it is known as "болгарка" ("bolgarka") (literally "Bulgarian" of the feminine gender), since the first angle grinders in the USSR were Bulgarian made.

See also
 Abrasive saw

References

Grinding machines
Hand-held power tools
Articles containing video clips
German inventions
1954 in science
1954 in Germany

it:Smerigliatrice#Smerigliatrice angolare